Soprano sfogato ("Vented" soprano) is a contralto or mezzo-soprano who is capable — by sheer industry or natural talent — of extending her upper range and encompassing the coloratura soprano tessitura. An upwardly extended "natural" soprano is sometimes called soprano assoluto.

Origin 

In the early 19th century as well as in the baroque and classical periods, distinctions between voices were not based so much on the range as in the tessitura and color of the voice. There were two main groups: soprano and alto. Their range was often blurred, relying more on tessitura to cast different roles in opera. In Italian bel canto, the soprano did not have extremely high notes actually written (often just to B5 or high C) and it was not until the "nightingale" type of sopranos such as Jenny Lind, Fanny Persiani, Adelina Patti, and her imitators that ending the cabalettas in a climactic high E6 or E6 became traditional as it was in the French grand opera which became so popular when Rossini moved to Paris. Singers however did ornament higher than C6 but in a light and fast way as it was done still in the classical and baroque periods. Virtuosity was shown by mercurial agility, changes in register and tessitura, perfect control of dynamics and tonal coloration, not by whistle-like high notes.

For contraltos on the other hand, they started to be more used in Rossini's bel canto operas for example, and to assume roles replacing the castrati who by that time were almost extinct, and composers demanded a range often going as high as B5. This change in demand of the voice would give birth to the soprano sfogato or assoluta.

These voices had in common with those of the greatest castrati the ability to sing widely contrasting tessituras, segments well into the contralto and segments in high soprano.

Characteristics 

By definition, the soprano sfogato is linked to the contralto. It possesses a dark timbre with a rich and strong low register, as well as the high notes of a soprano and occasionally a coloratura soprano. Those voices are typically strong, dramatic and agile, supported by an excellent bel canto technique and an ability to sing in the soprano tessitura as well as in the contralto tessitura with great ease, such as was said of Giuditta Pasta.

Exponents 

In the 20th century, the main exponent of this voice category was Maria Callas who had a range of F below middle C to in alt E6. She sang excerpts of roles for mezzo-soprano, including Cenerentola, Carmen, Rosina and Dalila in the original keys and also many roles associated with the soprano sfogato, such as Médée, Armida, Norma, Anna Bolena, Amina, Imogene, Abigaille, and Lady Macbeth.

Roles 

Other roles associated with this voice type are Elisabetta in Roberto Devereux, Gemma di Vergy, Reiza in Carl Maria von Weber's Oberon.

The common requirements for the roles associated with this voice type are:
 widely varied tessitura throughout the role, extended segments lying well into the low mezzo or contralto tessitura and segments lying in high soprano tessitura
 a range extending down to at least low B and at least up to high B with at least one whole tone required at either end
 fioritura (coloratura) singing in the most intricate bel canto style
 florid singing combined with heroic weight
 a heavy or dense sound in the lower range
 vocal power over energetic orchestral accompaniment

The major exponents of the soprano sfogato vocal type were able to sing both soprano and contralto roles: Giuseppina Ronzi de Begnis was the first Elisabetta in Devereux, and she also performed Bellini's Romeo as well as Norma; Isabella Colbran sang both Armida and Desdemona in Rossini's Otello as well as the contralto role of Paisiello's Nina and Mozart's soprano heroines; Giuditta Pasta originated Anna Bolena, Norma and La Sonnambula as well as singing Cenerentola, Tancredi, Arsace, Cherubino and Romeo.

Notes and references 
Notes

References

Further reading
 Ferris, George Titus, Great Singers, First Series (Faustina Bordoni to Henrietta Sontag); Great Singers, Second Series (Malibran to Titiens), D. Appleton & Company, New York (1881)
 Snider, Jeffrey, "In Search of the Soprano Sfogato", Journal of Singing, vol. 68, no. 3 (January/February 2012)

Italian opera terminology
Voice types